Tundi Agardy (born May 10, 1957) is a marine conservationist and the founder of Sound Seas – a Washington DC-based group specializing in working at the nexus of marine science and policy in order to safeguard ocean life.

Education and inspiration

Hungarian by descent, Agardy was born in the United States after her parents and sister fled Hungary. She had the good fortune of being selected to participate in a high school expedition to the U.S. Virgin Islands to learn about field biology, and there cemented her desire to focus on the sea and the challenges to preserving its wonders. After studying at Wellesley and Dartmouth Colleges in New England (USA), she returned to the Virgin Islands to lead an Endangered Species Management Program in cooperation with the US Fish and Wildlife Service. Years later she returned to graduate school at the University of Rhode Island (URI), where she simultaneously worked towards her Master of Marine Affairs (specializing in fisheries management) and her Ph.D. in Biological Sciences (sea turtle population dynamics and genetics). While at URI she joined the nascent Coastal Resources Center, exporting US experience in coastal planning to developing countries. Agardy then went on to do a post-doc at the Woods Hole Oceanographic Institution (WHOI), and was a Marine Policy Fellow there for several years. It was while at WHOI that she began working with the multilateral institutions that would shape her interests and work in years to come: the Man and Biosphere Reserve Programme of UNESCO and the International Union for the Conservation of Nature and Natural Resources (IUCN). The love of the sea that her husband Josh Spring and children Alex, Sophie, and Christopher all share is a continuing source of inspiration.

Environmental NGO work

In 1990, Agardy moved to Washington to work as Senior Scientist for World Wildlife Fund (WWF). At the time there was no formal marine program, but country programs were encouraged to do more in the marine conservation realm, and Agardy assisted in priority-setting, project design, and project execution, working in Africa, Asia, the Caribbean and Central America, and Europe. As much of this work centered on marine protected areas, she used the wealth of knowledge acquired in her experiences to write the acclaimed book “Marine Protected Areas and Ocean Conservation”.  During this time, Agardy also worked closely with IUCN field and headquarters programs, and chaired the Marine Advisory Group that guided the Union's marine conversation activities over multiple triennia. She later joined Conservation International to launch CI's Global Marine Program, and shortly thereafter founded Sound Seas, looking for ways to interface between the scientific community, the international policy arena, and the NGO and multilateral institutions relying on scientific information and policy frameworks in order to achieve effective marine conservation.

Assessment and evaluation

Sound Seas began with small teams addressing the needs of philanthropic foundations to conduct evaluations and undertake strategic planning. Through Sound Seas Agardy conducted a strategic evaluation of the John D. and Catherine T. MacArthur Foundation’s Population, Consumption, and Environment Program, and assisted the Oak Foundation in its early efforts to support marine protected area initiatives worldwide.  Agardy worked with colleagues to design the Coral Reef Targeted Research Project of the World Bank, and prepared a feasibility study for the institutional arrangement that supported it. Sound Seas explored the feasibility of establishing a research station on Palmyra Atoll for The Nature Conservancy (TNC), and conducted evaluations for the United Nations Development Programme in the Black Sea region, United Nations Environment Programme (UNEP) for its support of WWF climate change work in Cameroon, Fiji, and Tanzania, and International Financial Corporation (IFC) in its support of TNC work in Komodo, Indonesia. She is continuing to work with UNEP's Mediterranean Action Programme, coordinating an initial assessment of the Mediterranean Sea to promote the Ecosystem Approach in the region. This builds on the work she has done in marine protected areas, targeted marine research, and identification of ecologically important areas, in Italian waters and in the Mediterranean as a whole.

In 2001, shortly after founding Sound Seas, Agardy began brainstorming with colleagues from the World Resources Institute about how to recognize the value of natural ecosystems for humanity. This led to her involvement with the Millennium Ecosystem Assessment (MEA), which in 2005 published the first global evaluation of the status of ecosystems in relation to human well-being. Agardy headed the coastal portion of this comprehensive assessment, and was co-author of the summary document “Ecosystems and Human Well-Being: Biodiversity Synthesis".

Coastal and marine management and training

Building on experiences gained in promoting marine protected areas, policies aimed at marine biodiversity conservation, and integrated coastal and marine planning, Agardy published several books that continue to provide guidance for marine managers today. A co-authored publication entitled “Biodiversity in the Seas” has been credited as spurring many marine conservation activities that followed the adoption of the Jakarta Mandate of the Convention on Biological Diversity, focusing world attention on the value and status of life in the seas. Her innumerable publications on marine protected area (MPA) and MPA network design, on science and information needs in planning, and on integrated or ecosystem-based marine management have helped to add rigor to the field of marine conservation. Her book “Ocean Zoning: Making Marine Management More Effective" explores the tool of zoning in Marine Spatial Planning and integrated management more generally. Working through the Center for Biodiversity at the American Museum of Natural History, Sound Seas created several teaching modules on marine conservation biology, international treaties, and marine protected areas.  Her 2011 UNEP publication describes the core principles behind EBM and outlines steps to achieve it, and this book serves as the basis for training and capacity building in various regions around the world, including in the Mediterranean Sea (through the Barcelona Convention and its Mediterranean Action Programme) and the Red Sea region (PERSGA).

Marine ecosystem services and market

Recognizing the inadequate resource base that exists for doing marine management effectively around the world, Agardy joined Forest Trends in 2006 to explore innovative financing for marine conservation. The focus of the MARES (Marine Ecosystem Services) Program that she launched is on assessing the value of coastal and marine habitats for the myriad ecosystem services they provide, and identifying opportunities for Payments for Ecosystem Services (PES), offsets, or other market-like mechanisms to generate revenues that support conservation (and, very often, local communities that provide stewardship).

Communications

Agardy is Science and Policy Director at the World Ocean Observatory and writes on ocean issues for the organization's Ocean Observer. She is also Contributing Editor of MEAM (Marine Ecosystems and Management) - a publication on ecosystem-based management produced in association with the University of Washington (USA).

Awards and honorary positions

In 2006, Agardy was selected to receive the University of Miami’s Rosenstiel Award for Significant Achievement in Oceanography and Marine Policy. She was given the Civic Scientist of the Year Award by the Earthwatch Foundation in 1998, and the Secretary of State Open Forum Distinguished Public Service Award in the same year. The URI Alumni Association granted her the Award for Excellence in Research in 1996, and in 1995 she was selected by TIME Magazine as one of the fifty most promising young leaders in America. She serves on numerous Boards of Trustees, international advisory bodies, and sat on the US Federal Advisory Committee on Marine Protected Areas.

References

External links 
 World Ocean Observatory

1957 births
Living people
Dartmouth College alumni missing graduation year
Wellesley College alumni
University of Rhode Island alumni
American people of Hungarian descent
American marine biologists
American conservationists